Belo Jardim Futebol Clube, commonly known as Belo Jardim, is a Brazilian football club based in Belo Jardim, Pernambuco state.

History
The club was founded on January 18, 2005. Belo Jardim finished in the second position in the Campeonato Pernambucano Second Level in 2011, losing the competition to Serra Talhada, thus they were promoted to the 2012 First Level.

Stadium
Belo Jardim Futebol Clube play their home games at Estádio José Bezerra de Mendonça, commonly known as Mendonção. The stadium has a maximum capacity of 7,000 people.

References

Football clubs in Pernambuco
Association football clubs established in 2005
2005 establishments in Brazil